The snow leopard is a type of large cat.

Snow Leopard, snow leopard or The Snow Leopard may also refer to:

 Ang Rita Sherpa, a Nepali mountaineer nicknamed "Snow Leopard" who summited Mount Everest 10 times
 Kwame Nkrumah-Acheampong, known as the Snow Leopard, a Ghanaian skier
 Mac OS X Snow Leopard, the seventh major release of Apple's OS X operating system
 Obtusipalpis pardalis or snow leopard, an African moth
 Snow Leopard award, a Soviet mountaineering award
 Snow Leopard awards, at the Asian World Film Festival in Los Angeles
 Snow Leopard Commando Unit, a special police unit of the People's Republic of China
 The Snow Leopard, a book by Peter Matthiessen
 The Snow Leopard (EP), an EP by Shearwater

See also
 Snow Leopard Trust, an organisation working for the conservation of the snow leopard
 Snow lion